Dixie Farms is a neighborhood near the district of Uceta Yard, which represents District 5 of the Tampa City Council. The 2000 census numbers were unavailable, however, the latest estimated population was 34 and the population density was 249 people per square mile.

Geography
Dixie Farms boundaries are roughly 52nd Street to the west, Broadway to the north, and Uceta Yard to the south and east. The ZIP Code serving the neighborhood is 33619.

Education
Dixie Farms is served by Hillsborough County Public Schools, which serves the city of Tampa and Hillsborough County.

References

External links
Dixie Farms neighborhood detailed profile
Dixie Farms (in Hillsborough County, FL) Populated Place Profile
Maps, Weather, and Airports for Dixie Farms, United States

Neighborhoods in Tampa, Florida